Paano Ba ang Mangarap? (International title: Without Your Love / ) is a 2009 Philippine television drama romance series broadcast by GMA Network. Based on a 1983 Philippine film of the same title, the series is the twelfth instalment of Sine Novela. Directed by Joel Lamangan, it stars Jennylyn Mercado and Mark Herras. It premiered on February 16, 2009 on the network's Dramarama sa Hapon line up. The series concluded on June 5, 2009 with a total of 78 episodes. It was replaced by Ngayon at Kailanman in its timeslot.

Premise
Despite their different social backgrounds, Lissa and Benny have found their match in each other. Unfortunately, Benny dies before they could marry, and Lissa is left with no choice but to seek the help of Benny's parents. Their arrogance is as lofty as their fortune, and to them, Lissa is nothing but an opportunist. Their only concern is their late son's unborn child that Lissa is carrying. The only person who treats Lissa with kindness is Eric, Benny's brother, who has secretly fallen in love with her. Eric made a promise to Benny that he would find Lissa and take good care of her, a promise that Eric vowed he will never break.

Cast and characters

Lead cast
 Jennylyn Mercado as Elizabeth "Lissa" Estrella-Valderama
 Mark Herras as Eric Valderama

Supporting cast
 Chynna Ortaleza as Maya Benitez
 Tirso Cruz III as Don Mateo Valderama
 Bing Loyzaga as Doña Francia Balmores-Valderama
 Rainier Castillo as Vince Galton
 Irma Adlawan as Ising Estrella
 Emilio Garcia as  Ramon Tolibas
 Jan Marini Alano as Gemma Estrella
 Jay Aquitania as Ardi
 Jim Pebangco as Gardo
 Ysa Villar as Glaiza
 Menggie Cobarrubas

Guest cast
 Hero Angeles as Benjamin "Benny" Valderama

Ratings
Based from AGB Nielsen Philippines' Mega Manila household television ratings, the pilot episode of Paano Ba ang Mangarap? earned a 21.9% rating. While the final episode scored a 27.8% rating.

References

External links
 

2009 Philippine television series debuts
2009 Philippine television series endings
Filipino-language television shows
GMA Network drama series
Live action television shows based on films
Philippine romance television series
Television shows set in the Philippines